Abbas Kaoud (born 2 January 1948) is an Egyptian former professional squash player.

Kaoud was born in Cairo, Egypt. He moved to Chatham, Kent and turned professional in 1973. He represented Egypt during the 1971 World Team Squash Championships.

References

External links
 

Egyptian male squash players
1948 births
Living people
Sportspeople from Cairo
Egyptian emigrants to England
20th-century Egyptian people